St Mary's (also known as St. Mary's Holm) is a small village in the parish of Holm on Mainland, Orkney, Scotland. It was originally a fishing port.

Orkney F.C., the island group's main football club, plays its home games at The Rockworks Community Park, St. Mary's. Close to the ground, immediately to the north of the northernmost Churchill barrier, is a totem pole, erected as part of a community project in 2007 by local carvers and members of the Squamish First Nation people of western Canada.

References

External links

Scapaflow.co - St Mary's, Holm Archived from the original on 2016-06-11. Retrieved 2018-06-20.

Villages on Mainland, Orkney